Hunger und Seide is a book of essays (or, "mixed prose") by Nobel Prize-winning author Herta Müller. It was first published in 1995.

References

Essays about literature
1995 books